George Barker (February 1875–unknown) was an English footballer who played in the Football League for Everton and Wolverhampton Wanderers.

References

1875 births
English footballers
Association football defenders
English Football League players
Everton F.C. players
Bristol City F.C. players
Bedminster F.C. players
Wolverhampton Wanderers F.C. players
Year of death missing